Peripatus haitiensis is a species of velvet worm in the Peripatidae family. The female of this species has 30 to 32 pairs of legs. The type locality is in Haiti.

References

Onychophorans of tropical America
Onychophoran species
Animals described in 1913